Magdalene asylums, also known as Magdalene laundries, were initially Protestant but later mostly Roman Catholic institutions that operated from the 18th to the late 20th centuries, ostensibly to house "fallen women". The term referred to female sexual promiscuity or work in prostitution, young women who became pregnant outside of marriage, or young girls and teenagers who did not have familial support. They were required to work without pay apart from meagre food provisions, while the institutions operated large commercial laundries, serving customers outside their bases.

Many of these "laundries" were effectively operated as penitentiary workhouses. The strict regimes in the institutions were often more severe than those found in prisons. This contradicted the perceived outlook that they were meant to help women as opposed to punishing them. A survivor said of the working conditions: "The heat was unbelievable. You couldn't leave your station unless a bell went." Laundries such as this operated in the United Kingdom, Ireland, Sweden, Canada, the United States, and Australia, for much of the 19th and well into the 20th century, the last one closing in 1996.  The institutions were named after the Biblical figure Mary Magdalene, in earlier centuries characterised as a reformed prostitute.

The first Magdalene institution was founded in late 1758 in Whitechapel, England. A similar institution was established in Ireland by 1767. The first Magdalene asylum in the United States was the Magdalen Society of Philadelphia, founded in 1800. All these were Protestant institutions. Other cities followed, especially from around 1800, with Catholic institutions also being opened. In the 19th and early 20th centuries, Magdalene asylums were common in several countries. By 1900, there were more than 300 asylums in England and more than 20 in Scotland.

Magdalene laundries by country

England, Scotland, and Wales (1758)
The first Magdalen institution, Magdalen Hospital for the Reception of Penitent Prostitutes, was founded in late 1758 in Whitechapel, London by Robert Dingley, a silk merchant, Jonas Hanway and John Fielding. The women worked at services and crafts to help provide financial support for the house. They were also given a small sum of money for their work. Additional income was generated by promoting the house as a tourist attraction for the upper classes. Horace Walpole, Fourth Earl of Orford, described staging one of these entertainments. This was in keeping with visits to Bethlem Royal Hospital and the Foundling Hospital.  It later moved to Streatham, and could eventually house about 140 women, admitted between the ages of 15 and 40.    Bristol (40 women) followed in 1800, Bath (79) in 1805, and many other cities in the years following, though their names mostly no longer included "Magdalene".  Historians estimate that by the late 1800s, there were more than 300 Magdalen Institutions in England alone.

In 1797, the Edinburgh Royal Magdalene Asylum was founded in the Canongate in Old Town, a popular location for street prostitutes. Some of the women were drawn to the city by industrialisation, some were pregnant and some had been forced into prostitution. Mary Paterson, (also known as Mary Mitchell) was murdered by William Burke shortly after leaving the institution on April 8, 1828. The Edinburgh asylum moved to Dalry around 1842. The programme was supported in part by laundry and sewing work done by the residents. In Glasgow, the Magdalene Asylum became the Magdalene Institute and functioned until 1958.

Writer Charles Dickens and philanthropist Angela Burdett-Coutts established an alternative in 1846, thinking the Magdalen Hospitals too harsh. At Urania Cottage the young women were prepared for re-entry into mainstream society, or for emigration to the colonies.

By the late 1800s, many of the institutions had departed from the original model and resembled penitentiary work-houses. Since these were viewed as commercial workshops and factories, they were subject to labour regulations and inspections. The Factory Act (1901) limited working hours for girls of thirteen to eighteen years of age to twelve hours a day. Magdalene laundries, in one format or another, were found in many of the major industrial centres of England and Wales, examples including the Convent of the Good Shepherd at Penylan, Cardiff. This was a common name for such institutions.

Ireland (1765–1998)

The first Magdalene laundry or asylum in Ireland, an Anglican or Church of Ireland-run institution, Magdalen Asylum for Penitent Females, opened on Leeson Street in Dublin in 1767, after two years of preparation. It was founded by Lady Arabella Denny, admitted only Protestant women, and had an episcopal chapel. Around 1805, John England of Cork established a female reformatory together with male and female poor schools. Pending the opening of the Church of Ireland-run Magdalen Asylum in Cork, he maintained and ministered to many applicants. The Magdalene Asylum in Cork (Sawmill Street) opened in 1810. The last Magdalene laundry closed on 25 September 1996 in Waterford. This building has been adapted for use as the Waterford Institute of Technology.

In Belfast, Northern Ireland, the Church of Ireland-run Ulster Magdalene Asylum and episcopal chapel, was founded in 1839. The asylum closed in 1916 and the St Mary Magdalene chapel became a parish church. Parallel institutions were run by Roman Catholics and Presbyterians (the Ulster Female Penitentiary and Laundry). Ferriter described the laundries as "a mechanism that society, religious orders and the state came up with to try to get rid of people deemed not to conforming to the so-called... Irish identity." The Irish government claimed that the State was not legally responsible for the abuse suffered by women and girls in the Magdalene laundries, as these were religious institutions.

The discovery in 1993 of a mass grave on the grounds of a former convent in Dublin led to media articles about the operations of the institutions. Ultimately the UN Committee on the Rights of the Child called for a government inquiry into the Magdalene laundries. A formal state apology was issued in 2013, and a €60 million compensation scheme for survivors was established. By 2011, the four religious institutes that ran the Irish asylums had not yet contributed to compensate survivors of abuse, despite demands from the Irish government, and the UN Committee Against Torture. The religious sisters continue to care for more than 100 elderly Magdalene women who remain in their care. An estimated 600 survivors were still alive in March 2014.

Senator Martin McAleese chaired an Inter-Departmental Committee to establish the facts of State involvement with the Magdalen laundries. An Interim Report was released in October 2011. In 2013 the BBC did a special investigation, Sue Lloyd-Roberts' "Demanding justice for women and children abused by Irish nuns."

The Magdalene Sisters, a 2002 film by Peter Mullan, is based on historical facts about four young women incarcerated in a Magdalene laundry in Ireland from 1964 to 1968.

In 2011, a monument was erected in Ennis, County Clare, dedicated to the Sisters of Mercy, who had an industrial school and a Magdalene Laundry in the town. In 2015, Ennis municipal council decided to honour the same order by renaming a road in recognition of their compassionate service to vulnerable women and children.  The road runs through the site of the former industrial school and laundry. People are divided about these honours.

United States (1800)

The first Magdalene asylum in the United States was the Magdalen Society of Philadelphia, founded in 1800.  Other North American cities, including New York, Boston, Chicago, and Toronto, quickly followed suit.

Asylum records show that in the early history of the Magdalene movement, many women entered and left the institutions of their own accord, sometimes repeatedly. Lu Ann De Cunzo wrote in her book, Reform, Respite, Ritual: An Archaeology of Institutions; The Magdalene Society of Philadelphia, 1800–1850, that the women in Philadelphia's asylum "sought a refuge and a respite from disease, the prison or almshouse, unhappy family situations, abusive men, and dire economic circumstances."  In its early years, the Magdalen Society Asylum functioned as a refuge for prostitutes. Most of these stayed a few days or a few weeks, just long enough to get reclothed and recuperated. Attempts at rehabilitation met with little success. In 1877, the asylum was changed into a home for "wayward girls", with a rule requiring a stay for twelve months. As the Magdalen Society Asylum became more selective, relaxed its emphasis on personal guilt and salvation, and standardized the treatment of inmates, its rate of failure diminished.

The Penitent Females' Refuge Society of Boston was incorporated in 1823.

New York's Magdalen Society was established in 1830 with the purpose of rescuing women from lives of prostitution and vice. Advocates of women sometimes kidnapped them from brothels. In 1907 a new home was established in the Inwood section of upper Manhattan. The Society had twice moved to a larger facility. Many of the young women who were temporary residents at the Inwood institution had worked in the taverns, brothels, and alleyways of lower Manhattan before being "rescued" by the Society.  Girls were generally committed for a period of three years. Through the years, several girls died or were injured climbing out of windows in failed escape attempts. In 1917, the Magdalen Benevolent Society changed its name to Inwood House. In the early 1920s, bichloride of mercury was commonly used to treat new arrivals for venereal disease, as penicillin was not yet available. Some women suffered mercury poisoning, as happened with patients on the outside. The property was later sold and the agency relocated. Inwood House continues to operate, with its main focus on teen pregnancy.

Canada (1848)
The Congregation of the Sisters of Misericorde was founded in Montreal in 1848 by Marie-Rosalie Cadron-Jetté, a widow skilled as a midwife. Their network of asylums developed from their care of unmarried pregnant women until after they gave birth. In this period, unmarried women were encouraged to give their illegitimate children up for adoption. The Misericordia Sisters endeavoured to carry out their ministry discreetly, for the public was neither supportive of their cause nor charitable to the young women they aided. The sisters were accused of "encouraging vice". The order was particularly sensitive to the social stigma attached to a woman who had borne an illegitimate child. The sisters perceived that, by precluding other employment, this stigma often tended to force a woman into prostitution, and in some cases infanticide. According to Sulpician Father Éric Sylvestre, "When food was scarce, Rosalie would fast so that the moms could eat. She was fond of saying that 'Single mothers are the treasure of the house.'"

"In receiving patients no discrimination is made in regard to religion, colour, or nationality. After their convalescence, those who desire to remain in the home are placed under a special sister and are known as 'Daughters of St. Margaret'. They follow a certain rule of life but contract no religious obligations. Should they desire to remain in the convent, after a period of probation, they are allowed to become Magdalens and eventually make the vows of the Magdalen institute."

In 1858, Elizabeth Dunlop and others founded the Toronto Magdalene Laundries, with the stated goal of "eliminating prostitution by rehabilitating prostitutes".

Sweden (1852)

In Sweden, the first Magdalene asylum (Magdalenahem) was founded in Stockholm in 1852 by the philanthropist Emilie Elmblad. By 1900, there were eight asylums in Sweden, of which half were managed by the Salvation Army.

The asylums' purpose was to educate or train former female prostitutes in a different occupation, to make it possible for them to support themselves when they left the asylum. In practice, they were trained in domestic occupations in the asylums. The asylums tried to place former residents as domestic servants in private homes, preferably with religious employers. In this period, many people still worked as domestic servants, and women especially had limited work opportunities.

As the asylums were normally managed by religious women philanthropists such as Elsa Borg, the goal was not only to provide them with employment but to encourage their religious practice, which was thought to help them avoid returning to prostitution. The asylums provided the clients with factory work only if the first choice of being a domestic in a private religious home failed. Employment in a public establishment, such as a hotel or a restaurant, was considered the least desirable choice, as such work was considered to be a great risk for women in terms of reentering prostitution.

This was in line with several other common private charitable establishments especially in Stockholm, which provided poor women in the cities with shelter and employment (normally as domestics), to prevent them from becoming prostitutes.

The asylums were charity institutions and founded in great part by the work of the women in domestic training there. Initially, women were paid for their work. This practice was abandoned when overseers concluded that it made women less inclined to follow rules. In Sweden, the majority of the inmates of the Magdalena asylums had voluntarily committed themselves, seeking help. There were known cases of women being committed by her family or by authorities. The Magdalena Asylum in Stockholm was closed in 1895.

Australia (1890)
From the early 1890s to the 1960s, most Australian state capitals had a large Roman Catholic convent that contained a commercial laundry where the work was done by the mostly teenage girls who were placed in the convent. They were committed, voluntarily or involuntarily, for reasons such as being destitute, "uncontrollable" as judged by family members or picked up by the police. According to James Franklin, the girls came from a variety of very disturbed and deprived backgrounds and were individually hard to deal with in many cases.

Laundry work was regarded as suitable as part of the work program for the girls, as it did not require much training nor substantial capital expense. Former inmates consistently have reported negative memories of conditions in the convent laundries, detailing verbal abuse by nuns and other supervisors, and very hard physical work under difficult conditions. In accordance with the traditions of the nuns, much of the day proceeded in silence. Like orphanages, these institutions received almost no government funds. As in any underfunded institution, the food was described as bland. The nuns shared the conditions of the women inmates, such as bad food, hard work, confinement, and long periods of silence. Education for residents was either of poor quality or lacking altogether. The sisters had no physical contact with the girls, nor emotional contact in the sense of listening to the girls' concerns.

Dangers included the infectious diseases of the time and workplace accidents. In 1889, one of the sisters of the Abbotsford Convent in Victoria lost her hand in an accident involving laundry machinery. In 1942 14-year-old Doris Dyer lost her arm from the shoulder when she was caught in the laundry mangle at the Home of the Good Shepherd laundry in West Leederville, Western Australia (now the Catherine McAuley Centre).

The asylums were initially established as refuges, with the residents free to leave. In the early 1900s, they reluctantly began to accept court referrals. "They took in girls whom no-one else wanted and who were forcibly confined, contrary to the wishes of both the girls and the nuns." A 1954 report of the Sun Herald of a visit to the Ashfield laundry found 55 girls there involuntarily, 124 voluntary inmates, including 65 mentally challenged adult women, and about 30 who were originally there involuntarily but had stayed on. The dormitories were described as seriously overcrowded.

Notable residents of Magdalene asylums
 Sinead O'Connor

See also
 Duplessis Orphans
 Monto
 Mother and Baby Homes Commission of Investigation
 Workhouse

References

Citations

General sources 
 , also Oxford University Press, 2004

Further reading
 
 
 
   (another edition). It formed the basis for the 2013 film Philomena.
 .

External links

 
 
 Magdalene Laundry Testimony – survivors artwork, Australian laundries
 
 

 
Imprisonment and detention
Laundry organizations
Religious scandals